The Birlas are some of the foremost businesses in India.

Birlas may also refer to:

 Birlas (confederation), a Turko-Mongol nomadic confederation in Central Asia
 Murtaza Birlas (21st century), Pakistani writer